José Eleazar Ascanio (born May 2, 1985) is a Venezuelan professional baseball pitcher who is currently a free agent. He has played in Major League Baseball for the Atlanta Braves, Chicago Cubs and Pittsburgh Pirates. Ascanio Has Two Children Jordan Ascanio and Santiago Ascanio

Career

Atlanta Braves
Ascanio was signed as an undrafted free agent in 2001 by Atlanta. He began his professional career with the GCL Braves, where he went 4–1 with a 1.37 ERA and 17 strikeouts at age 18. The next year, with the Rome Braves, he went 3–3, with a 3.84 ERA and 64 strikeouts, as well as a career-high 9 saves, in 34 games.

In 2005, he played in 5 games for the Myrtle Beach Pelicans, recording 3 wins, 1 loss, a 6.10 ERA, and a career-low 12 K, before being sidelined with a fractured back injury.

On July 13, 2007, Ascanio was called up by the Braves after Wilfredo Ledezma had trouble getting back to the U.S. after going home to Venezuela during the All-Star break. Ascanio made his debut the same day, pitching the ninth inning of a 9–1 win.  Ascanio allowed one run on three hits in his first Major League appearance, striking out two in the process. He was sent down on July 31 and called up again on August 24. He earned his first Major League win on September 14 pitching the last two innings of a 13-inning game. He finished the season 1–1 with a 5.06 ERA.

Chicago Cubs
On December 4, 2007, Ascanio was traded to the Chicago Cubs for reliever Will Ohman and infielder Omar Infante.

On May 10, 2009, Ascanio was called up by the Cubs from Triple-A Iowa after possessing a 1.01 ERA in 26 innings pitched as a starter. He was expected to start in the back of the bullpen. He appeared in 14 games for the Cubs, with a 3.52 ERA.

Pittsburgh Pirates

On July 30, 2009, Ascanio was traded to the Pittsburgh Pirates with Kevin Hart and Josh Harrison for John Grabow and Tom Gorzelanny. He appeared in 2 games for the Pirates in 2009 and another 8 in 2011, with a 7.00 ERA. He spent all of 2010 and much of 2011 on the disabled list due to shoulder surgery performed on him late in the 2009 season.

The Pirates designated him for assignment on June 7, 2011.

Los Angeles Dodgers
He was signed by the Los Angeles Dodgers to a minor league contract on December 13, 2011. He also received an invitation to spring training. He failed his physical when he reported for spring training and had his contract voided by the Dodgers.

Mexican League
Ascanio was assigned to the Diablos Rojos del México in 2013, and was later signed by the Petroleros de Minatitlán. In 2014, he started the season with the Toros de Tijuana and later was assigned to the Acereros de Monclova where he finished the year. He signed with the Guerreros de Oaxaca for the 2015 season, and spent the 2016 and 2017 seasons out of the league. On January 8, 2018, it was announced that Ascanio would return to the Mexican League with the Tecolotes de los Dos Laredos. He was released on April 3, 2018.

Italian Baseball League
Ascanio pitched in twelve games for San Marino of the Italian Baseball League in 2017. He posted a 4.61 ERA and recorded two saves.

After the 2019 season, he played for Caribes de Anzoátegui of the Liga Venezolana de Béisbol Profesional(LVMP). He has also played for Venezuela in the 2020 Caribbean Series.

After the 2020 season, he played for Caribes of the LVMP. He has also played for Venezuela in the 2021 Caribbean Series.

See also
 List of Major League Baseball players from Venezuela

References

External links
, or Retrosheet, or Pura Pelota, or CBS SportsLine, or RotoChamps

1985 births
Living people
Acereros de Monclova players
Atlanta Braves players
Bradenton Marauders players
Chicago Cubs players
Diablos Rojos del México players
Indianapolis Indians players
Guerreros de Oaxaca players
Gulf Coast Braves players
Gulf Coast Pirates players
Iowa Cubs players
Leones del Caracas players
Major League Baseball pitchers
Major League Baseball players from Venezuela
Mexican League baseball pitchers
Mississippi Braves players
Myrtle Beach Pelicans players
Petroleros de Minatitlán players
Pittsburgh Pirates players
Rome Braves players
Sportspeople from Maracay
Tecolotes de los Dos Laredos players
Toros de Tijuana players
Venezuelan expatriate baseball players in Mexico
Venezuelan expatriate baseball players in the United States
Venezuelan expatriate baseball players in San Marino